Fernando Niño (died 1552) was a Roman Catholic prelate who served as Patriarch of West Indies (1546–1552),
Administrator of Sigüenza (1546), 
Archbishop of Granada (1542–1546), 
and Bishop of Orense (1539–1542).

Biography
Fernando Niño de Guevara was born in Toledo, Spain.
On 18 Aug 1539, he was appointed during the papacy of Pope Paul III as Bishop of Orense.
On 5 Oct 1539, he was consecrated bishop. 
On 22 Mar 1542, he was appointed during the papacy of Pope Paul III as Archbishop of Granada.
On 8 Oct 1546, he was appointed during the papacy of Pope Paul III as Patriarch of West Indies and Apostolic Administrator of Sigüenza.
He served as Patriarch of West Indies until his death on 16 Sep 1552.

While bishop, he was the principal consecrator of Pedro Guerrero Logrono, Archbishop of Granada (1547) .

References

External links and additional sources
 (for Chronology of Bishops) 
 (for Chronology of Bishops) 
 (for Chronology of Bishops) 
 (for Chronology of Bishops) 
 (for Chronology of Bishops) 
 (for Chronology of Bishops) 
 (for Chronology of Bishops) 
 (for Chronology of Bishops) 

16th-century Roman Catholic archbishops in New Spain
Bishops appointed by Pope Paul III
1552 deaths
16th-century Roman Catholic archbishops in Spain